Free at Last is an album by American jazz pianist Mal Waldron recorded in 1969 and released on the ECM label. The album was the first release on the influential European jazz label.

Reception 

The AllMusic review by Scott Yanow awarded the album 3 stars stating "The music overall is not that memorable or unique but it does have its unpredictable moments and finds Waldron really stretching himself." JazzTimes, in its retrospective analysis of ECM's first 50 years, commented on the label's first release that: "It's doubtful that anyone who heard Free at Last in its day took particular notice of its fledgling label, but an unheeded message is still a message: We're on a different wavelength."

Track listing
All compositions by Mal Waldron except as indicated
 "Rat Now" – 10:18 
 "Balladina" – 5:05 
 "1-3-234" – 4:05 
 "Rock My Soul" – 11:23 
 "Willow Weep for Me" (Ann Ronell) – 7:34 
 "Boo" – 3:24  
Recorded at Studio Bauer in Ludwigsburg, West Germany on November 24, 1969.

Personnel 
 Mal Waldron – piano
 Isla Eckinger – bass
 Clarence Becton – drums

References 

Mal Waldron albums
1970 albums
Albums produced by Manfred Eicher
ECM Records albums